Marcus Timmons (born November 3, 1971) is an American-Australian former professional basketball player. He played for the Wollongong Hawks, Melbourne Tigers, Perth Wildcats, Cairns Taipans, New Zealand Breakers and Adelaide 36ers. Timmons won NBL championships with the Tigers in 1997 and the Wildcats in 2000.

Timmons has also played pro basketball in the Philippines, Poland, and Latvia. He won a Latvian championship with ASK/Brocēni/LMT. He is the uncle of NBA player Otto Porter Jr.

Timmons was named Mr. Show-Me Basketball in 1991 while he played at Scott County Central High School in Sikeston, Missouri. He played college basketball for Southern Illinois University. He was part of three Saluki NCAA Tournament appearances and an NIT appearance. He was Missouri Valley Conference Defensive Player of the year in 1995. He was named to the SIU All-Century team in 2013 and is a member of the SIU Saluki Hall of Fame.

References

External links
College statistics
Eurobasket.com Profile

1971 births
Living people
Adelaide 36ers players
American expatriate basketball people in Australia
American expatriate basketball people in Latvia
American expatriate basketball people in New Zealand
American men's basketball players
Basketball players from Missouri
Cairns Taipans players
Centers (basketball)
Forwards (basketball)
Melbourne Tigers players
New Zealand Breakers players
Perth Wildcats players
Place of birth missing (living people)
Southern Illinois Salukis men's basketball players
Illawarra Hawks players
Yakima Sun Kings players
American expatriate basketball people in the Philippines
Philippine Basketball Association imports
Pop Cola Panthers players